Virtually a Virgin is a 2008 Hungarian drama film written and directed by Péter Bacsó. It was entered into the 30th Moscow International Film Festival.

Cast
 Júlia Ubrankovics as Boróka
 Attila Tóth as Móric
 Gergely Kaszás as Ronaldó
 Ferenc Hujber as János
 György Cserhalmi as Teacher
 Sándor Lukács as Rich Man
 Kati Lázár as Ronaldó's mother
 Andrea Fullajtár as Wife
 Antal Cserna as Husband
 Gábor Máté as Dr. Gyülevészi
 Dénes Ujlaky as Homeless Man
 Ildikó Pécsi as Auntie Fanni

References

External links
 

2008 films
2008 drama films
Hungarian drama films
2000s Hungarian-language films
Films directed by Péter Bacsó